"Learning How to Bend" is a song co-written and recorded by American country music singer Gary Allan.  It was released in March 2008 as the second single from his 2007 album Living Hard. The song peaked at number 13 on the U.S. Billboard Hot Country Songs chart.  Allan wrote the song with James LeBlanc and Matt Warren.

Critical reception
Thom Jurek of Allmusic thought that the song had better production than the others on the album, saying, "With the echo effects on the vocal and the big strings at the same volume as those ringing, jangling guitars, [the musicians] can't miss."

Jonathan Keefe of Slant Magazine also made note of Allan's "effective falsetto."

Leeann Ward of CountryUniverse.net gave it an A rating, citing Allan's "raw and powerful delivery" and his use of falsetto in the chorus, as well as the "interesting production."

Music video
The music video was shot in Atlantic City, New Jersey, and at live performances, and was directed by Stephen Shephard, who also directed his previous music video "Watching Airplanes" in 2007.

Chart performance
"Learning How to Bend" debuted at number 51 on the U.S. Billboard Hot Country Songs chart dated April 5, 2008.

References

2008 singles
Country ballads
2000s ballads
Gary Allan songs
MCA Nashville Records singles
Songs written by Gary Allan
Song recordings produced by Mark Wright (record producer)
2007 songs
MCA Records singles